Magnolia stellata, sometimes called the star magnolia, is a  slow-growing shrub or small tree native to Japan. It bears large, showy white or pink flowers in early spring, before its leaves open. This species is closely related to the Kobushi magnolia  (Magnolia kobus), and is treated by many botanists as a variety or even a cultivar of that.  However, Magnolia stellata was accepted as a distinct species in the 1998 monograph by Hunt.

Description

Young plants display upright oval growth, but the plants spread and mound with age.

There is natural variation within the flower color, from white to rich pink; the pink also changes from year to year, depending on day and night air temperatures prior to and during flowering. The flowers are star-shaped, with at least 12 thin, delicate petal-like tepals, some cultivars having more than 30.

The leaves open bronze-green, turning to deep green as they mature, and yellow before dropping in autumn.

Mature fruit opens by slits to reveal orange-red seeds, but the fruits often drop before developing fully.

Young twigs have smooth, shiny chestnut brown bark, while the main trunks have smooth, silvery gray bark. Like the saucer magnolia (Magnolia × soulangeana), it is deciduous, revealing a twiggy, naked frame in winter.
Plants have thick, fleshy roots which are found fairly close to the surface and do not tolerate much disturbance.

Origins
It grows by streamsides and in moist, boggy areas with such other woody plants as Enkianthus cernuus, Corylopsis glabrescens var. gotoana and Berberis sieboldii.

Hybrids
Magnolia × loebneri = Magnolia kobus × Magnolia stellata.
This hybrid was first obtained by Max Loebner of Pillnitz, Germany.  Paul M. Kache designated the new hybrid in 1920, to honour Max Löbner. Numerous other varieties are produced by these parents as 'Leonard Messel' and 'Merrill'. The selection, 'Leonard Messel' was a chance hybrid that was developed at Messel's garden in Sussex, UK, Nymans. Also on the market are white 'Ballerina' and the late-flowering white 'Merrill' that extend the loebneri season.

Magnolia × proctoriana = Magnolia salicifolia × Magnolia stellata. The hybrid of these closely related species was first obtained in 1925 at the Arnold Arboretum of Harvard University.
Magnolia liliiflora × Magnolia stellata, hybrid obtained at the U.S. National Arboretum by Francis DeVos and William Corsair. There are in the trade eight varieties with women's names, the "Eight Little Girls".

Cultivation
After it was introduced to the United States in 1862 by Dr. George Robert Hall (1820-1899), Magnolia stellata has been widely cultivated in much of North America, and has been recorded as an established escape in a few places.  It is also a commonly grown ornamental in Europe, and was first introduced to the United Kingdom in 1877 or 1878, most likely by Charles Maries, while he was collecting for Veitch Nurseries.

Its compact size makes it an ideal subject for smaller gardens, where its flowers - appearing initially on bare stems - provide some much needed colour in early Spring.
The cultivars 'Centennial', 'Jane Platt', and 'Royal Star' have all gained the Royal Horticultural Society's Award of Garden Merit.

Spring frosts can damage the flowers.  The shrub prefers deep, acidic soil. It may be propagated by seed, or more easily by rooting cuttings taken after the flower buds have formed.

Gallery

References

External links
 Magnolia stellata images in the Arnold Arboretum of Harvard University Plant Image Database

stellata
Endemic flora of Japan
Trees of Japan
Veitch Nurseries
Garden plants of Asia
Ornamental trees